Desperate Housewives is an American television comedy drama and mystery series which first aired on ABC from October 3, 2004 until May 13, 2012, and was created by Marc Cherry. The series follows the lives of a group of women living on fictional street named Wisteria Lane as seen through the eyes of their late friend Mary Alice Young (portrayed by Brenda Strong), who narrates the series. The four main characters featured in the series are Susan Mayer (portrayed by Teri Hatcher), Lynette Scavo (portrayed by Felicity Huffman), Bree Van de Kamp (portrayed by Marcia Cross) and Gabrielle Solis (portrayed by Eva Longoria). The series received generally favorable reviews from critics and won numerous awards, including seven Primetime Emmy, two People's Choice, three Golden Globe, four Screen Actors Guild and many other awards. Its first five seasons were ranked within the top ten most-watched television shows in the United States. Huffman and Kathryn Joosten were the only actresses to win Primetime Emmy Awards for their roles of Lynette Scavo and Karen McCluskey, respectively, while Hatcher won a Golden Globe Award and was nominated for a Primetime Emmy Award for her role of Susan Mayer; Cross was nominated for both Primetime Emmy and Golden Globe Awards for her role of Bree Van de Kamp, while Longoria was nominated for Golden Globe and Screen Actors Guild Awards for her role of Gabrielle Solis. Strong, who narrated the series as late Mary Alice Young, was nominated for two Primetime Emmy Awards for Outstanding Voice-Over Performance.

ADG Excellence in Production Design Awards

AFI Awards

ALMA Awards

American Cinema Editors

BAFTA Awards

Bambi Awards

Banff Television Festival

BET Awards

BMI Film & TV Awards

Casting Society of America

Cinema Audio Society Awards

Costume Designers Guild Awards

Directors Guild of America Awards

Emmy Awards

Primetime Emmy Awards

GLAAD Media Awards

Gold Derby Awards

Golden Globe Awards

Goldene Kamera

IFMCA Awards

Imagen Foundation Awards

Monte-Carlo Television Festival

Golden Nymph Awards

Motion Picture Sound Editors

Golden Reel Awards

NAACP Image Awards

National Television Awards

New York International Film and TV Festival

OFTA Television Awards

People's Choice Awards

PRISM Awards

Producers Guild of America Awards

Publicists Guild of America

Satellite Awards

Screen Actors Guild Awards

TCA Awards

Teen Choice Awards

TP de Oro

TV Land Awards

TV Quick and Choice Awards

Writers Guild of America Awards

Women's Image Network Awards

Young Artist Awards

References 

Desperate Housewives
Desperate Housewives